Memory Man may refer to:

Literature
Memory Man (novel), a 2015 novel by David Baldacci
The Memory Man, a 2004 novel by Lisa Appignanesi

Music
Memory Man (album), a 2007 album by Aqualung
Memory Man, a delay effect pedal by Electro-Harmonix

Television
"The Memory Man" (1983), season 6, episode 2 of Tales of the Unexpected
"The Memory Man" (1987), series 5, episode 1 of Bergerac
"Memory Man" (1993), season 1, episode 11 of Moon Over Miami
"Memory Man" (2013), series 1, episode 1 of Count Arthur Strong